Blair College is now Everest College, a for-profit college in Colorado Springs, Colorado.  Everest College offers career college programs in a variety of areas including business, health care, legal and technology.

History of Blair College
The College was founded in Pueblo, Colorado, as Brown's School of Business in 1897, changing its name to Blair's Business College in 1918. Blair operated in Colorado Springs. In 1981, Blair Business College changed its name to Blair Junior College.  In 1996, the College was acquired by Rhodes Colleges, Inc., a division of Corinthian Colleges, Inc. and the name was changed to Blair College. In 2004 Blair College closed its doors to all students as it was no longer considered accredited due to its Corinthian status. In 2006 the school was renamed Everest College and opened a new location in Colorado Springs, but no longer held its accreditation with any department of education universities. Students that attended this school will no longer be able to transfer credits to a 4-year university to obtain a degree, and the US Department of Education will not allow students’ loans to be forgiven.

External links
Everest College - Colorado Springs Campus
Everest

Former for-profit universities and colleges in the United States
Educational institutions established in 1897
Corinthian Colleges
1897 establishments in Colorado